Reyðarfjörður is a town in Iceland. It has a population of 1,350 and is one of the most populated villages that constitute the municipality of Fjarðabyggð.

History
The town is at the bottom of the eponymous fjord, the largest on the east coast of Iceland. Although the climate is particularly rainy and foggy, on clear summer days it often has the highest temperatures in Iceland.

From the early 20th century, Reyðarfjörður was a trading port, as well as a fishing port. Due to its strategic location and good harbour conditions, it became the second-largest of the Allied bases in Iceland during World War II. There is a World War II museum located at the old camp above the town.

Reyðarfjörður joined Eskifjörður and Neskaupstaður in 1998 to form the new municipality of Fjarðabyggð ("fjords-settlement").

Geography

The other villages composing the municipality are: Eskifjörður (1,043 inh.), Fáskrúðsfjörður (662 inh.), Mjóifjörður (35 inh.), Neskaupstaður (1,437 inh.) and Stöðvarfjörður (203 inh.).

Fjarðaál aluminium smelter
A quiet fishing town since the war, Reyðarfjörður (and neighbouring communities) saw a revival in the early 2000s when Alcoa decided to build the Alcoa Fjarðaál  aluminium smelter there. It was built between 2004 and 2007 by the contractor Bechtel, requiring thousands of workers from various countries, most notably from Poland. At one point, the town had the highest concentration of foreign residents of any community in the country, and the number of workers reached as high as 2,800. By 2008, the construction workers had left. The townspeople have faith in the aluminium plant for the continuing prosperity of their old community, and surrounding communities.

The Fjarðaál aluminium smelter reached full production capacity in April 2008. The facility contains a smelter, cast house, rod production and deep-water port. The smelter employs 450 people and produces 940 tons of aluminium a day, with capacity of 346,000 metric tons of aluminium per year. Fjarðaál means "Fjords aluminium" in Icelandic.
For the smelter, the new Kárahnjúkar Hydropower Plant in the neighboring municipality of Fljótsdalshérað was built.

Catholic church

On 17 June 2017, a new Catholic Church (St. Thorlak Church) was consecrated in the town in a ceremony led by Bishop David Tencer of Reykjavik. Tencer is a Capuchin Franciscan and a native of Slovakia and the church building was a gift from the Slovak Catholic Church. The church was built from wood in Slovakia, disassembled and shipped to Reydarfjordur, where it was re-assembled. Robert Fico, the Prime Minister of Slovakia, attended the consecration.

In popular culture
Reyðarfjörður was chosen as the location for the Sky Atlantic series Fortitude. Filming took place during early 2014 for the first series and in 2016 for the second series.

Notes and references

External links

 Reyðarfjörður page on Fjarðabyggð municipal website

Populated places in Eastern Region (Iceland)